Lake Street Station may refer to the following places in the United States:


Chicago, Illinois
Lake station (CTA)
Clark/Lake station
State/Lake station

Minneapolis, Minnesota
Lake Street/Midtown station
I-35W & Lake Street station

Massachusetts
Lake Street station (Arlington, Massachusetts)
Lake Street station, now Boston College station

See also
 East Lake station
 Lake Street (disambiguation)